The Noor Mosque (Noor = Light) in Frankfurt-Sachsenhausen is the third purpose-built mosque in Germany. The mosque in Babenhäuser Landstraße is run by the Ahmadiyya Muslim Community (AMJ) and was inaugurated on September, 12th 1959 by Sir Muhammad Zafrulla Khan.

Before the Ahmadiyya Muslim Community in 1985 bought the „Nasir Bagh“ in Groß-Gerau, the annual gathering Jalsa Salana in Germany was celebrated in this mosque.

This mosque is well known for being the one that the heavyweight boxer Muhammad Ali prayed within once.

See also
Islam in Germany
List of mosques in Europe

References

1959 establishments in Germany
Ahmadiyya mosques in Germany
Religion in Frankfurt
Mosques completed in 1959
Mosques in Frankfurt
Mosque buildings with domes